Kowareta Piano to Living Dead (壊れたピアノとリビングデッド; Broken Piano and the Living Dead) is the fourteenth studio album by the Japanese rock band Mucc, released on February 13, 2019 by Danger Crue. It is a "horror concept album.

Due to the COVID-19 pandemic, the band had to cancel their Kowareta Piano to Living Dead European tour.

Recording and production 
For Kowareta Piano to Living Dead, Mucc recruited keyboardist Tooru Yoshida to the band for a limited time. The songs "Vampire" and "Countdown" were based on about 140 demos from the beginning of the band's career: "There were songs that I could hardly use, but some I could do. We listened to all of them, chose about 20 candidates and selected among them ", said guitarist Miya.

Commercial performance 
The album peaked at the sixteenth position on Oricon Albums Chart.

Track listing

Personnel 
 Tatsurou – vocals
 Miya – guitar
 Yukke – bass guitar
 Satochi – drums
 Tooru Yoshida – keyboards

Charts

References 

2019 albums
Mucc albums
Japanese-language albums
Concept albums